HMS H6 was a British H-class submarine of the Royal Navy built by Canadian Vickers & Co. during World War I.

History
She was completed on 10 June 1915 and was commissioned  by the Royal Navy the same year. However, her service in the Royal Navy was short. On 19 January 1916, she ran aground near the Dutch island of Schiermonnikoog, after which she was interned by the Royal Netherlands Navy. On 4 May 1917, an agreement was reached to sell H6 to the Netherlands.

Dutch service 
The Royal Netherlands Navy renamed H6 to HNLMS O 8 and refitted her, with knowledge gained from the interned German submarine . After UC-8 was bought from Germany O 8 was equipped with UC-8s Zeiss periscope. During maintenance in October 1921, O 8 partly sank in the harbour at Den Helder. Because only minor damage was sustained, she was repaired and continued in service.

During the German attack on the Netherlands at the start of the Second World War, O 8 was still in Dutch service. At the time she was undergoing maintenance and as a result could not escape during the invasion. Instead it was decided to scuttle her.

German service 
After the surrender of the Netherlands, the German forces were able raise O 8 and found her almost fully intact.

Germany took O 8 into service as UD-1 and transferred her from Den Helder to Kiel. In Kiel, she was used as training ship to train crews for the German U-boats. Because of her age, she was decommissioned on 23 November 1943. On 3 May 1945, she was scuttled again in the harbour at Kiel.

References

Bibliography

External links
 'Submarine losses 1904 to present day' - Royal Navy Submarine Museum 

 

British H-class submarines
Ships built in Quebec
1915 ships
World War I submarines of the United Kingdom
Maritime incidents in 1916
Royal Navy ship names
Submarines of the Royal Netherlands Navy
World War II submarines of the Netherlands
Submarines of the Kriegsmarine
U-boats scuttled in 1945
World War II submarines of Germany
World War II shipwrecks in the Baltic Sea
Naval ships of the Netherlands captured by Germany during World War II
Maritime incidents in May 1940
Maritime incidents in May 1945